Gamma-aminobutyric acid receptor subunit pi is a protein that in humans is encoded by the GABRP gene.

The gamma-aminobutyric acid (GABA) A receptor is a multisubunit chloride channel that mediates the fastest inhibitory synaptic transmission in the central nervous system. The subunit encoded by this gene is expressed in several non-neuronal tissues including the uterus and ovaries. This subunit can assemble with known GABA A receptor subunits, and the presence of this subunit alters the sensitivity of recombinant receptors to modulatory agents such as pregnanolone.

See also
 GABAA receptor

References

Further reading

External links 
 

Ion channels